Symphony of Death is a 1921 German silent film directed by Dimitri Buchowetzki and starring Robert Scholz, Bernhard Goetzke and Hanni Weisse.

The film's sets were designed by the art director Willi Herrmann and Gennaro Righelli.

Cast
 Robert Scholz as Sven Garden, Arzt
 Bernhard Goetzke as Olaf Hansen, Geiger
 Olga Engl as Frau Holgersen
 Hanni Weisse as Helga, ihre Tochter
 Otto Treptow as Petersen, Reporter
 Harald Bredow as Samuelson

References

Bibliography
 Steve Choe. Life and Death in the Cinema of Weimar Germany, 1919–1924. University of California, Berkeley, 2008.

External links

1921 films
Films of the Weimar Republic
German silent feature films
Films directed by Dimitri Buchowetzki
German black-and-white films
1920s German films